Marisa Pavan (born Maria Luisa Pierangeli; 19 June 1932) is an Italian actress who first became known as the twin sister of film star Pier Angeli (Anna Maria Pierangeli) before achieving success in her own screen career.

Early life and career
Pavan and her twin sister, Pier Angeli, were born in 1932 in Cagliari, Sardinia, the children of Enrichetta (née Romiti) and Luigi Pierangeli, a construction engineer. The two girls also had a younger sister, Patrizia Pierangeli, who became an actress as well.

Pavan had no dramatic training when she signed a Hollywood contract with Paramount at age 19. Although her screen debut was in 1952 in What Price Glory, Pavan's breakthrough role came three years later, when she was cast as Anna Magnani's daughter in The Rose Tattoo. That part was initially assigned to her twin sister, but by the time production began, Angeli was unavailable for the role. Pavan's performance earned an Oscar nomination for Best Supporting Actress. She also won the Golden Globe Award for (Best Supporting Actress) for her performance in the film.
 
Pavan co-starred in films such as Diane (1956), The Man in the Gray Flannel Suit (1956), The Midnight Story (1957) and John Paul Jones (1959). She also played Abishag in King Vidor's biblical epic Solomon and Sheba (1959). Her later films included A Slightly Pregnant Man (1973), Antoine and Sebastian (1974) and the television miniseries The Moneychangers (1976). In 1985, she played Chantal Dubujak on Ryan's Hope.

Personal life
On 27 March 1956, Pavan married French actor Jean-Pierre Aumont in Santa Barbara, California, and the couple remained together until Jean-Pierre's death in 2001. They had two sons: Jean-Claude, born in 1957, and Patrick, in 1960.

Selected filmography

 What Price Glory (1952)
 I Chose Love (1953)
 Down Three Dark Streets (1954)
 Drum Beat (1954)
 The Rose Tattoo (1955)
 Alfred Hitchcock Presents – "You Got to Have Luck" (1956)
 Diane (1956)
 The Man in the Gray Flannel Suit (1956)
 The Midnight Story (1957)
 John Paul Jones (1959)
 Solomon and Sheba (1959)
 Shangri-La (TV movie, 1960)
 Naked City – "Requiem for a Sunday Afternoon" as Josephine (1961)
 Combat – Season 2 Episode 12 "Ambush" as Marie Marchand (1963)
 The F.B.I. – Season 1 Episode 9 "The Exiles" as Maria Blanca (1965)
 The Diary of Anne Frank (TV movie, 1967)
 Cutter's Trail (TV movie) (1970)
 A Slightly Pregnant Man (1973)
 Antoine and Sebastian (1974)
 Hawaii Five-O (TV, 1977) "East Wind, Ill Wind" – Madame Sandanarik
 The Trial of Lee Harvey Oswald (TV movie, 1977)
 Wonder Woman "Formula 407" (TV, 1977)

References

External links
 

1932 births
Living people
Best Supporting Actress Golden Globe (film) winners
Expatriate actresses in the United States
Italian actresses
Italian expatriates in the United States
People from Cagliari
People of Marchesan descent
Italian twins